Martin Madden Sr. (born June 5, 1943) is a Canadian former ice hockey general manager. He served as general manager for the Quebec Nordiques from June 27, 1988 to February 2, 1990. Madden also spent time volunteer coaching the Quebec Beavers youth ice hockey team at the Quebec International Pee-Wee Hockey Tournament.

References

1943 births
Living people
Anaheim Ducks scouts
Ice hockey people from Quebec City
Montreal Canadiens scouts
New York Rangers scouts
Quebec Nordiques executives
Stanley Cup champions